GD 165 is a system of a white dwarf and a brown dwarf of spectral types DA4 + L4, located in constellation Boötes at approximately 103 light-years from Earth. GD 165 B remained the only brown dwarf companion of a white dwarf until the discovery of GD 1400 B, which was discovered 17 years later.

Nomenclature and observation
"GD" means "Giclas Dwarf".

The component GD 165 B was discovered in 1988 by Becklin and Zuckerman. It is the first L-type brown dwarf, and in general, the first dwarf cooler than M dwarfs discovered, but it was not recognized as a brown dwarf until the 1990s, when other such objects were found, starting from Gliese 229 B in 1995.

Initially it was tentatively assigned spectral type ≥M10, but in 1999 Kirkpatrick et al. established new spectral types L and T for newly discovered objects cooler than M-type stars, and GD 165 B was reclassified L4.

Distance
As of 1999 the most precise distance estimate of GD 165 was the  trigonometric parallax, published by van Altena et al. in 1995: 31.7 ± 2.5 mas, corresponding to a distance 31.5 pc, or 102.9 ly. In 2018 ESA's Gaia satellite measured the parallax of the system with high precision.

GD 165 distance estimates

Physical properties

The white dwarf GD 165 A is classical ZZ Ceti variable with a temperature of about 12 100 K and a mass of 0.64 .

GD 165 B has a temperature of about 1750 K and a mass of about 63 . Like all L-dwarfs GD 165 B lacks the dominant titanium oxide seen in warmer M dwarfs. The depletion of titanium oxide is caused by the formation of perovskite grains in the photospheres of L-dwarfs. Lithium is not detected in the spectrum of this L-dwarf, but considering the age of the system and the mass of the brown dwarf, any lithium should be destroyed, whether GD 165 B is a brown dwarf or not.

See also
The other later than M brown dwarfs, discovered before 1998:

Nakajima et al. (1995):
Gliese 229 B (T6.5, a companion to a red dwarf star)

Kirkpatrick et al. (1997):
2MASP J0345432+254023 (L0, first isolated L-dwarf)

Delfosse et al. (1997):
DENIS-P J020529.0-115925 (L7, isolated, later a companion was found)
DENIS-P J1058.7-1548 (L3, isolated)
DENIS-P J1228.2-1547 (L5, isolated, later a companion was found)

Ruiz et al. (1997):
Kelu-1 (L2, isolated, later a companion was found)

References

Boötes
Binary stars
White dwarfs
Brown dwarfs
L-type stars
J14243914+0917139
WISE objects
Bootes, CX
Astronomical objects discovered in 1988